The Chennai Central–Vasco da Gama Weekly Express is an Express train belonging to South Western Railway zone that runs between  and  in India. It is currently being operated with 17311/17312 train numbers on a weekly basis.

Service

The 17311/Chennai Central–Vasco da Gama Weekly Express has an average speed of 47 km/hr and covers 1030 km in 22h. The 17312/Vasco da Gama–Chennai Central Weekly Express has an average speed of 48 km/hr and covers 1030 km in 21h 25m.

Route and halts 

The important halts of the train are:

Coach composite

The train has standard ICF rakes with a max speed of 110 kmph. The train consists of 24 coaches :

 2 AC II Tier
 3 AC III Tier
 12 Sleeper coaches
 1 Pantry car
 4 General Unreserved
 2 Seating cum Luggage Rake

Traction

Both trains are hauled by an Erode Loco Shed-based WAP-4 electric locomotive from Chennai to Yesvantpur. From Yesvantpur, train is hauled by a Krishnarajapuram Loco Shed-based WDP-4 diesel locomotive to Vasco da Gama and vice versa.

Rake sharing 

The train shares its rake with 17315/17316 Vasco da Gama–Velankanni Weekly Express, 17309/17310 Yesvantpur–Vasco da Gama Express, 12741/12742 Vasco da Gama–Patna Superfast Express.

Direction reversal

Train reverses its direction 1 time:

See also 

 Vasco da Gama railway station
 Chennai Central railway station
 Vasco da Gama–Patna Superfast Express
 Vasco da Gama–Velankanni Weekly Express
 Yesvantpur–Vasco da Gama Express

Notes

References

External links 

 17311/Chennai Central - Vasco Da Gama Weekly Express
 17312/Vasco Da Gama - Chennai Central Weekly Express

Transport in Vasco da Gama, Goa
Transport in Chennai
Express trains in India
Rail transport in Goa
Rail transport in Karnataka
Rail transport in Tamil Nadu